Cliff Wheeler (1894–1979) was an American film director of the silent era.

Selected filmography
 A Bit of Heaven (1928)
 Comrades (1928)
 Into No Man's Land (1928)
 Making the Varsity (1928)
 One Splendid Hour (1929)

References

Bibliography
 Munden, Kenneth White. The American Film Institute Catalog of Motion Pictures Produced in the United States, Part 1. University of California Press, 1997.

External links

1894 births
1979 deaths
Film directors from Massachusetts
People from Springfield, Massachusetts